Tsuga dumosa, commonly called the Himalayan hemlock or in Chinese, Yunnan tieshan, is a species of conifer native to the eastern Himalayas. It occurs in parts of Nepal, India, Bhutan, Myanmar, Vietnam and Tibet. Within its native range the tree is used for construction as well as for furniture. In Europe and North America, it is occasionally encountered as an ornamental species and was first brought to the United Kingdom in 1838.

Description
The diameter at breast height is typically , but can be beyond . The crown on small trees is ovoid and their form is like that of pendulous bushes. Older trees tend to have multiple stems from one or two sinuous boles, especially in cultivation. The crown of mature trees is broad, irregular-pyramidal and open. The bark is a similar to that of an old larch: somewhat pinkish to grey-brown and heavily ridged with broad, shallow, flaky fissures. The branches are oblique or horizontal. The twigs are reddish brown or greyish yellow in their first year and are pubescent, i.e. covered with short hairs. Branches that are 2 to 3 years old are greyish brown or dark grey with leaf scars. The wood from the tree is a brownish yellow with a fine structure and straight veins.

The leaves are spirally arranged, pointing forward on the branches and placed distantly from one another compared to other species in the genus Tsuga. The ends are obtuse or rounded, and very occasionally emarginate. The upper surface of the leaves is green and shiny, while the undersides have 2 wide silvery stomatal bands. The upper half of the leaves usually have small dents on the margins, i.e. the margins are rarely entire. The midrib is concave on the upper surface.

The staminate flowers are globose in shape, solitarily arranged and axillary. The anthers are a green-yellow in colour and they lack an air sac. The pistillate flowers are round-ovate in shape, also solitarily arranged, terminal and slightly down-curved. They have many spiral scales with 2 ovules contained within each scale. Flowering occurs from April to May and fruiting from October to November.

Range and habitat
Tsuga dumosa is generally associated with the Himalayas. In India, it occurs from Uttarakhand in the west to Arunachal Pradesh in the east. The range continues southeast to northern Myanmar and Vietnam, and northeast to southeastern Tibet, northwestern Yunnan and southwestern Sichuan. In Vietnam it is only found at altitudes above  on Hoang Lien Son Mountain. In that country it is usually mixed with Rhododendron spp. and Abies pindrow, though it can sometimes form a pure stand. It is adapted to areas with a cold climate and high rainfall and high humidity.

References

dumosa
Trees of Myanmar
Trees of China
Flora of India (region)
Flora of East Himalaya
Flora of Assam (region)
Trees of Nepal
Trees of Vietnam
Flora of Sichuan
Flora of Tibet
Flora of Yunnan